The 1992 NAIA Division II football season, as part of the 1992 college football season in the United States and the 37th season of college football sponsored by the NAIA, was the 23rd season of play of the NAIA's lower division for football.

The season was played from August to November 1992 and culminated in the 1992 NAIA Division II Football National Championship, played in Portland, Oregon near the campus of Linfield College.

Findlay defeated Linfield in the championship game, 26–13, to win their second NAIA national title.

Conference realignment

Conference changes
 Before the season, the Nebraska Intercollegiate Athletic Conference rebranded as the Nebraska-Iowa Athletic Conference after the addition of Iowa-based Northwestern College. The NIAC had existed under its previous name since its foundation in 1969.

Membership changes

Conference standings

Conference champions

Postseason

See also
 1992 NCAA Division I-A football season
 1992 NCAA Division I-AA football season
 1992 NCAA Division II football season
 1992 NCAA Division III football season

References

 
NAIA Football National Championship